Verticillium theobromae is a plant pathogen infecting banana and plantain.

See also 
 List of banana and plantain diseases

References

External links 
 Index Fungorum
 USDA ARS Fungal Database

Fungal plant pathogens and diseases
Banana diseases
Fungi described in 1951
Hypocreales incertae sedis